SPI Cinemas is an Indian multiplex chain originally owned by the SPI Group, headquartered in Chennai, Tamil Nadu. The company is often lauded for its premium quality and inexpensive pricing. Its theatres, primarily Sathyam, are often used by filmmakers for film premieres and audio launch events. Popcorn served at SPI Cinemas has received considerable praise from film goers and the media. In August 2018, PVR Cinemas completed the acquisition of SPI Cinemas.

The group is notable for being the first multiplex operator in India to equip its screens with the Dolby Atmos and Auro 11.1 sound systems.

History 

Sathyam Cinemas was originally named the "Royal Theatre Complex" and was built by Raja from Venkatagiri in April 1974. With a capacity of 1,255 seats, it was the largest multiplex built in Chennai at the time.

Kiran Reddy, the former CEO of SPI Group, revealed in a 2012 interview with The Hindu that Sathyam Cinemas was acquired by his family "from someone" in the 1980s. It was acquired for real estate purposes with no intention of continuing the theatre business. He claimed, "The intent was to demolish the Sathyam building. The theatre wasn't a viable business if you looked at the value of the land." However, when he got involved in the business, the family had made several improvements to the theatre. Reddy had taken over the business in 1999 and continued developing the theatre, adding three more screens and refurbishing the existing three.

Acquisition by PVR Cinemas 
SPI Cinemas was acquired by PVR Cinemas in August 2018. In August 2019, the National Company Law Tribunal (NCLT) New Delhi-branch approved the amalgamation of SPI Cinemas into PVR with effect from the appointed date of 17 August 2018, PVR said in the exchange filing. With this acquisition, PVR became the largest multiplex operator in Tamil Nadu with 14 properties (including Puducherry) and more in the pipeline. PVR is looking to expand further by opening more theatres in South Indian cities like Bengaluru, Mysore, Chennai, Hyderabad, Coimbatore and Vizag. As of January 2021, integration and rebranding of all the acquired properties as PVR has started in a phased manner. Also all future projects will be branded as PVR. This includes the state of Tamil Nadu as well. The SPI cinemas website and mobile app is now a cloned version of PVR website/mobile app and the customers will be able to book movie tickets in both SPI and PVR Website/app. This was done with the intention of phasing out the SPI website and mobile app in the near future. PVR has also launched its private movie screening experience and its loyalty program 'PVR Privilege' across SPI properties.

Locations

References

External links 

1974 establishments in India
Companies based in Chennai